Riverton Historic District is a national historic district located at Front Royal, Warren County, Virginia. The district encompasses 66 contributing buildings and one  contributing site in the town of Front Royal.  It is a primarily residential district with buildings dating from the mid-19th century and including a diverse collection of building types and architectural styles.  Notable buildings include Lackawanna (1869), the Old Duncan Hotel (c. 1880), the Riverton United Methodist Church (1883-1890), Dellbrook (c. 1884), the Carson Lime Company worker's houses, and the Old Riverton Post Office and Grocery.  Located in the district and separately listed is Riverside.

It was listed on the National Register of Historic Places in 2000.

Gallery

References

External links

Historic districts in Warren County, Virginia
National Register of Historic Places in Warren County, Virginia
Front Royal, Virginia
Historic districts on the National Register of Historic Places in Virginia